Crenshaw is an unincorporated community and census-designated place in Snyder Township, Jefferson County in the U.S. state of Pennsylvania. As of the 2010 census, the population was 468 residents.

Demographics

History
The railroad was extended to Crenshaw around 1882. A post office was established at Crenshaw in 1886, and remained in operation until 1967.

References

External links

Census-designated places in Pennsylvania